Ketovaleric acid may refer to:

 α-Ketovaleric acid
 β-Ketovaleric acid (3-oxopentanoic acid)
 γ-Ketovaleric acid (levulinic acid)